Hans G. Syz (15 October 1891 – 23 December 1954) was a Swiss tennis player. He has represented Switzerland at the 1920 Summer Olympics and in the 1924 Summer Olympics.

References

External links 
 Profile at Sports-Reference.com

1891 births
1954 deaths
Swiss male tennis players
Olympic tennis players of Switzerland
Tennis players at the 1920 Summer Olympics
Tennis players at the 1924 Summer Olympics
People from Alameda, California
Tennis people from California
Swiss people of American descent